Maurice William Day (23 April 1858 – 29 August 1916) was an Irish Anglican priest in the late 19th and early 20th centuries.

He was the son of a clergyman (His father was Bishop of Cashel, Emly, Waterford and Lismore from 1872 until 1899); and was educated  at Repton School and Trinity College, Dublin.  Ordained in 1882,  after  curacies  at Queenstown  and Waterford he held  incumbencies at  Newport, County Tipperary  and then Kilbrogan, County Cork. In 1887 he married Katherine Louisa Frances Garfitt: they had one daughter and four sons, two of which were killed in the First World War. 1900 he became Chaplain to the Bishop of Cashel and Waterford. From 1908 to 1913 he was Dean of Cashel; and, from 1913 to 1916, Dean of Waterford.

References

1858 births
People educated at Repton School
Alumni of Trinity College Dublin
Irish Anglicans
Deans of Cashel
Deans of Waterford
1916 deaths